Bozovici is a commune in Caraș-Severin County, western Romania with a population of 2,924 people. It is composed of four villages: Bozovici, Poneasca (Ponyászkatelep), Prilipeț (Prilipec), and Valea Minișului (Ménesvölgy).

It lies on the banks of the river Nera; the river Miniș discharges into the Nera in Valea Minișului village.

Izvorul Bigăr (or, the Bigăr Waterfall) is a protected area situated on the administrative territory of Bozovici, in the Nera Gorge-Beușnița National Park.

Also located on the territory of the commune is the Bozovici coal mine. This is an underground mining exploitation, one of the largest of its kind in Romania.

Natives
 Nicolae Osmochescu
 Sebastian Velcotă

References

Communes in Caraș-Severin County
Localities in Romanian Banat
Mining communities in Romania